The Type 072II landing ship (NATO designation Yuting class) are large landing ships built by Shanghai-based Hudong-Zhonghua Shipyard as a successor to the Type 072 landing ship. A total of four hulls have been delivered to the People's Liberation Army Navy (PLA Navy) since the early 1990s. The Type 072II is the PLA Navy's first amphibious warfare ship to have a flight deck for helicopter take-off/landing. There are three ships currently in People's Liberation Army service, all of which are deployed in East Sea Fleet of the PLA Navy (PLAN ESF). All active ships are built by China Shipbuilding Shipyard (中华造船厂) in Shanghai.

Ships of the class

See also
People's Liberation Army Navy Surface Force
List of active People's Liberation Army Navy ships

References

External links
Global Security Chinese Warships (globalsecurity.org)

Amphibious warfare vessel classes
Amphibious warfare vessels of the People's Liberation Army Navy